The Pure Silk-Bahamas LPGA Classic was a women's professional golf tournament in The Bahamas on the LPGA Tour. It debuted in May 2013 at Ocean Club Golf Course on Paradise Island, adjacent to Nassau. Ilhee Lee won the inaugural event, two strokes ahead of Irene Cho.

Winners

* The 2013 tournament was reduced to 36 holes played in three 12-hole rounds due to course flooding.   The original tournament dates in 2013 were May 23–26.

Tournament records

References

External links

Coverage on LPGA Tour's official site
Ocean Club Golf Course

Former LPGA Tour events
Golf tournaments in the Bahamas
Recurring sporting events established in 2013
Recurring sporting events disestablished in 2018